N. armatus  may refer to:
 Nanobagrus armatus, a catfish species 
 Neocirrhitus armatus, a hawkfish species from the Pacific Ocean
 Nymphargus armatus, a frog species endemic to Colombia